Tales from the Cryptkeeper is an animated horror children's television series made by Canadian studio Nelvana. The series was broadcast on YTV in Canada and on ABC in the United States, and on ITV in the United Kingdom.

It was based on the 1950s EC Comics series Tales from the Crypt and the live action television series of the same name, which aired concurrently on HBO. Intended for children, Tales from the Cryptkeeper was significantly milder than its live action version and all blood and gore, profanity and sexual content were completely removed in order to target the audience.

Most episodes take place within the fictional city of Gravenhurst, California (population 55,232). This name is given in the tenth episode "The Gorilla's Paw", the same buildings which are shown in this episode are also seen in many other episodes in the series, and many of the characters speak with very obvious California accents.

The series was cancelled on December 10, 1994, and returned to the air in 1999 as The New Tales from the Cryptkeeper. The animation differed from previous episodes, and it transferred to Teletoon in Canada, and also to CBS in the United States.

Plot
The series details the Cryptkeeper telling other horror stories to the viewers, each with a lesson to be learned.

In Season 2, the Cryptkeeper was continually feuding with his rivals and fellow EC Comics horror hosts, the Vault-Keeper and the Old Witch who were continually trying to steal the show from him as they didn't have one of their own, only to have their plans backfire on them. This season also saw the Cryptkeeper in different locales than his mansion, as he tried to elude his rivals.

Season 3 is aired in 1999 was the final season of the series. It was the only season to never aired on YTV in Canada and ABC in the United States. Instead, New Tales from the Cryptkeeper aired on Teletoon in Canada and on CBS in the United States. In this season, The Cryptkeeper takes a more active role in the stories. Usually by setting up situations to teach targeted kids with severe character flaws frightening lessons.

Cast
 John Kassir as The Cryptkeeper
 Elizabeth Hanna as The Old Witch
 David Hemblen as The Vault Keeper
 Luca Perlman as Ralph
 Asia Vieira as Erin
 Daniel DeSanto as Dwight / Jimmy and Rob
 Tara Strong as Jenny
 Kevin Zegers as Jeremy / 6X
 Kristen Bone as Katie / Sharon Sharalike
 Noah Reid as Steven
 Nathaniel Siegler as Randall
 Lisa Yamanaka as Becky
 Janet-Laine Green as Beth, Erin's Mom
 Harvey Atkin as Uncle Harry / Harold Klump
 William Colgate as Professor Perry
 Diane Fabian as Aunt Dorothy
 Michael Barry as Wendell
 Maia Filar as Julia
 Bryn McAuley as Karen
 Amos Crawley as Eddie / Pete 
 Andrew Sabiston as Louis / Head Counselor Bill and Dale
 Frances Hyland as Aunt Melba
 Thor Bishopric as Kevin
 Tabitha St. Germain as Rose's Mom / Sally and Zola
 Marc Donato as David
 Tyrone Savage as Evan
 Zachary Bennett as Buddy
 Kyle Downes as Brock
 Miklos Perlus as Vince
 Brooke Nevin as Jan
 Alyson Court as Kirsten
 Robert Tinkler as Anthrax / Blob
 Valentina Cardinalli as Camille
 Marsha Moreau as Mildred
 Stuart Stone as The Boy / Sheldon / Boy With Dog / Itchy and Craig
 Tara Meyer as Stephanie / Rose
 Jon-Erik Laggano as Leo
 Kevin Duhaney as Jamie
 Ari Magder as Randy
 Jeannie Diggins as Mary Anne
 Tracy Ryan as Shauna
 Jamie Haydon-Devilin as Dale / Poindexter
 David Deveau as Gary
 Dominic Zamprogna as Peter / Simon / Kid and Vincent
 Mairon Bennett as Naomi
 Daniel Stemer as Arnold
 Skyellar Pollack as Steve
 Noam Zylberman as Stu
 Elva Mai Hoover as Dr. Mahdi
 Jean Daigle as Ben
 Len Carlson as Injun Joe / Visitor Leader
 Kevin Hanchard as Mary Anne's Dad
 Rino Romano as Eddie
 Len Doncheff as Ed, Erin's Grandpa
 Stephen Ouimette as Chuck
 John Stocker as Melvin
 George Buza as William and Mr. Armstrong
 Linda Ballantyne as Jamie's Mom
 Richard Binsley as Mr. Feral

Episodes

Series overview

Season 1 (1993)

Season 2 (1994)

New Tales from the Cryptkeeper, Season 3 (1999)

Syndication
In North America, the series was premiered on YTV and on ABC, but later on Teletoon and CBS. In August 2012, Fearnet aired reruns in their "Funhouse" block, only on weekends. Spanish-dubbed episodes of the series aired on Telefutura; as part of Toonturama block on Saturday and Sunday morning as "Cuentos de la Cripta" from 2002 to 2005.

In October 2021, the live streaming television Filmrise Kids began airing the whole series every day.

Outside of North America, the series aired on Canal+ and M6 in France, Kindernet in the Netherlands and ITV in the United Kingdom.

Home media
Season releases

In 2007, kaBOOM! Entertainment released "The Complete First Season" on DVD.

References

External links
 

Tales from the Crypt
1993 American television series debuts
1994 American television series endings
1999 American television series debuts
1999 American television series endings
1990s American animated television series
1990s American anthology television series
Television shows set in the United States
Television shows set in California
American children's animated anthology television series
American children's animated comic science fiction television series
American children's animated science fantasy television series
American children's animated horror television series
1993 Canadian television series debuts
1994 Canadian television series endings
1999 Canadian television series debuts
1999 Canadian television series endings
1990s Canadian animated television series
1990s Canadian anthology television series
Canadian children's animated anthology television series
Canadian children's animated comic science fiction television series
Canadian children's animated science fantasy television series
Canadian children's animated horror television series
American Broadcasting Company original programming
YTV (Canadian TV channel) original programming
Teletoon original programming
Television shows based on comics
Television series by Nelvana
Television series by Warner Bros. Television Studios
Witchcraft in television
1990s American comic science fiction television series
1990s Canadian comic science fiction television series